Schmalzerode is a village and a former municipality in the Mansfeld-Südharz district, in Saxony-Anhalt, Germany. Since 1 January 2009, it is part of the town Eisleben.

Former municipalities in Saxony-Anhalt
Eisleben